The Ryan PT-22 Recruit, the main military version of the Ryan ST, is a military trainer aircraft used by the United States Army Air Corps during WWII for primary pilot training.

Design and development

The PT-22's fuselage is a simple monocoque structure, with thick gauge alclad skin. The wings feature spruce spars, aluminum alloy ribs, steel compression members, with aircraft fabric covering aft to the trailing edge and aluminum alloy sheet covering from the leading edge to the spar. The wings have 4° 10' of sweep back, 3° of incidence and 4° 30' dihedral.

The PT-22 fuel system consists of a single tank mounted forward of the front cockpit. Fuel is gravity fed to the carburetor. The oil system is a dry-sump type, with all oil stored in a tank located on the front side of the firewall in the upper section of the fuselage. The wing flaps are mechanically operated from a lever located on the left side of each cockpit. Adjustable elevator trim is provided via an elevator trim tab controllable from a handwheel mounted on the left side of each cockpit. In its original configuration, the aircraft was not equipped with an electrical system. Hydraulic brakes are provided for each wheel, controllable via the rudder pedals in each cockpit.

In order to simplify maintenance, the wheel spats and landing gear fairings were deleted in the production examples

Operational history
The PT-22 was developed in 1941 from the civilian Ryan ST series. The earlier PT-20 and PT-21 were the military production versions of the Ryan ST-3 with a total of 100 built. The PT-22 was the United States Army Air Corps' first purpose built monoplane trainer. The rapid expansion of wartime aircrew training required new trainers, and the Ryan PT-22 was ordered in large numbers. Named the "Recruit", it entered operational service with the U.S. Orders also were placed by the Netherlands, but were never realized as the nation capitulated to Axis forces. The small order of 25 ST-3s was redirected to the United States and redesignated as the PT-22A. Another order also came from the U.S. Navy for 100 examples. The PT series was in heavy use throughout the war years with both military and civil schools, but with the end of the war, was retired from the USAAF.

The Ryan PT-22 remains a popular World War II collector aircraft.

Variants

PT-22Military version of the Model ST.3KR powered by a 160 hp R-540-1, 1,023 built.
PT-22AModel ST-3S twin-float seaplanes ordered by the Netherlands Navy powered by 160 hp Menasco D4B, ordered cancelled and completed for the United States Army Air Corps with 160 hp R-540-1 engines, 25 built.
PT-22BUnbuilt project.
PT-22CPT-22s re-engined with the 160 hp R-540-3, 250 conversions.

Operators
 
 
 Ecuadorian Air Force
 
 United States Army Air Corps
 United States Army Air Forces

Aircraft on display

 41-15329 – PT-22 on display at the Air Combat Museum in Springfield, Illinois.
 41-15654 – PT-22 on display at the Vintage Flying Museum in Fort Worth, Texas. It is awaiting an engine rebuild.
 41-15721 – PT-22 on static display at the National Museum of the United States Air Force in Dayton, Ohio.
 41-20652 – PT-22 on static display at the Main Campus of the Air Zoo in Kalamazoo, Michigan.
 41-20952 – PT-22 on static display at the Evergreen Aviation & Space Museum in McMinnville, Oregon.
 41-21039 – PT-22 on static display at the Museum of Aviation in Warner Robins, Georgia.
 42-57481 – PT-22A on static display at the Udvar-Hazy Center of the National Air and Space Museum in Chantilly, Virginia.
 42-57492 – PT-22A in storage at the New England Air Museum in Windsor Locks, Connecticut.

Surviving aircraft

Several PT-22 remain in flyable condition worldwide, as the aircraft continues to be a popular sport plane and warbird.

 41-1902 – PT-22 airworthy at the Commemorative Air Force Minnesota Wing in South St. Paul, Minnesota.
 c/n 1812 – ST-3KR airworthy at the Port Townsend Aero Museum in Port Townsend, Washington.
 41-20855 – PT-22 airworthy with the Shuttleworth Collection at Old Warden, Bedfordshire. This airframe is the first PT-22 prototype and is designated "001".

Specifications (PT-22)

References

Notes

Bibliography

 Cassagneres, Ev. The New Ryan: Development and History of the Ryan ST and SC. Eagan, Minnesota: Flying Books, 1995. .
 Donald, David, ed. Encyclopedia of World Aircraft. Etobicoke, Ontario, Canada: Prospero Books, 1997. . 
 Mondey, David. American Aircraft of World War II (Hamlyn Concise Guide). London: Bounty Books, 2006. .
 Pilots Flight Operating Instructions for Army Model PT-22 Airplanes, T.O. NO. 01-100GC-1. Wright-Patterson AFB, Ohio: U.S. Army Air Forces, 1943.
 United States Air Force Museum Guidebook. Wright-Patterson AFB, Ohio: Air Force Museum Foundation, 1975.
 Dorr B. Carpenter. "Ryan Sport Trainer", SunShine House, Terre Haute Indiana. . 1990.

External links 

1940s United States military trainer aircraft
World War II trainer aircraft of the United States
PT-22
Low-wing aircraft
Single-engined tractor aircraft